The Edmonton Transit Service (ETS) route system is the result of a transit strategy that was passed by city council on July 11, 2017. The redesigned system is composed of: 
9 frequent routes operating at least every 15 minutes (at most times of day) in core areas of the city
13 rapid routes connecting outer areas of the city to downtown and other major destinations (including LRT stations and post-secondary institutions)
6 crosstown routes connecting outer quadrants of the city without operating through downtown
84 local routes connecting neighbourhoods to local destinations and other routes
9 community routes designed to connect seniors residences with nearby services. The intention behind the redesign is to allow for simplified routes with increased frequency.

Route numbers are assigned in a clockwise direction. This redesigned bus network was originally scheduled to be implemented on August 30, 2020, but was postponed until April 25, 2021, as a result of the COVID-19 pandemic, to save approximately $3.7 million and defer tax increases for residents. The system replaces the  "Horizon 2000" transit plan, was approved by city council in July 1996 and put in place on June 29, 1997.

Frequent Routes (1–9)
These routes operate often and travel on main roads in central regions of the city. Some frequent routes are only slightly modified from their existing versions and retain their current number.

Crosstown Routes (51–56, 73)
These routes connect outer quadrants of the city without operating through downtown.

Local and Community Routes
These routes operate mainly within one area of the city and are numbered roughly clockwise by region.

North Edmonton (100's)

South-East Edmonton (501–526)

South-West Edmonton (701–726)

West Edmonton (900's)

Rapid/Express Routes (X suffix)
These routes contain limited stops and carry commuters from the suburbs to key central destinations.

North Edmonton (100X's)

South-East Edmonton (500X's)

South-West Edmonton (700X's)

West Edmonton (900X's)

Special Routes/Commuter Service (540–589, 747)
Numbers in this series are used for commuter routes from outlying areas. Most of these routes remain unchanged from prior to the redesign.

On-Demand Transit
This service operates on-demand, not on a fixed schedule.  The minibuses cannot carry bicycles.  Passengers are not charged until they board an ETS bus or LRT train.

Stony Plain Road Shuttle
This route uses a cutaway shuttle vehicle and runs every 60 minutes between Jasper Place Transit Centre and Unity Square in Oliver.  Bicycles are not allowed on this route.

See also
Edmonton Light Rail Transit
Transportation in Edmonton

Notes

References

Edmonton Transit Service
bus routes in Edmonton
Edmonton
Bus routes